Adamówka  (Adamivka) is a village in Przeworsk County, Subcarpathian Voivodeship, in south-eastern Poland. It is the seat of the gmina (administrative district) called Gmina Adamówka.

The village has a population of 1,205.

References

Villages in Przeworsk County